This article covers technical details of the character encoding system defined by ETS 300 706, a standard for World System Teletext, and used for the Viewdata and Teletext variants of Videotex in Europe.

Character sets 
The following tables show various Teletext character sets. Each character is shown with a potential Unicode equivalent if available.  Space and control characters are represented by the abbreviations for their names.

Control characters
Control characters are used to set foreground and background color (black, red, green, yellow, blue, magenta, cyan, white, flash), character height (normal, double width, double height, double), current default character set, and other attributes.

Latin

G0

G2

Greek

G0

G2

Cyrillic

G0

G2

Arabic
Note that each Arabic contextual/positional character in the tables below is shown with the non-positional Unicode equivalent if available.

G0

G2

Hebrew

Graphics character sets

G1 block mosaics

Same table as above, rendered with bitmaps:

G3 smooth mosaics and line drawing

References 

Character sets
Teletext